My Goldfish is Evil is a Canadian animated television series that was created by Nicolas J. Boisvert. The series was produced by Sardine Productions for CBC Television and Télévision de Radio-Canada.

The show aired over two seasons, premiering in English-Canada on September 9, 2006 and concluding on December 15, 2007. In French-Canada, My Goldfish is Evil aired between January 14, 2007 and March 30, 2008.

Overview
The series follows the adventures of 11-year-old Beanie, and his pet goldfish, Admiral Bubbles. The superintelligent goldfish has dreams of bringing a reign of terror on the city and of world domination. Frequently, he escapes from his bowl in his attempts at mischief. With Beanie's mother always failing to believe him, Beanie must save the world himself.

Cast

Main
 Stephane Blanchette as Admiral Bubbles
 Sonja Ball as Beanie 
 Jane Wheeler as Beanie's mother

Supporting
 Alyson Wener as Nia, Beanie's girlfriend
 Bruce Dinsmore as Elwood, one of Beanie's friends
 Sonja Ball as Nanna, Beanie's maternal grandmother and Standford, another of Beanie's friends
 Lucinda Davis as Desmona, friend of Nia and "frenemy" of Beanie, Elwood and Standford
 Susan Glover as Miss Dalee, Beanie's schoolteacher
 Bruce Dinsmore as Principal Block, Beanie's school principal

Minor and guest
 Ian Ingram as Super Eric
 Stephane Blanchette as Officer Swanson 
 Bruce Dinsmore as Slappy the Clown
 Additional voices by Lucinda Davis, Bruce Dinsmore, Susan Glover, Rick Jones, John Koensgen, Alyson Wener

Production

My Goldfish is Evil was first presented at MIPCOM 2002 by Sardine Productions. In June 2003, CBC Television and VRAK.TV picked up the series for development. In February 2004, Super Ecran and VRAK officially picked the series up, with a finalized CBC deal pending. At the time, the show was set to enter production in spring 2004, with the first season airing in September 2005. Later that month, CBC officially greenlit the series. Over the summer of 2005, Sardine reported that the series would begin production in October, with CBC and Télévision de Radio-Canada now attached as the sole broadcasters. The English debut was set for fall 2006 and a French one in January 2007. The series was officially renewed for a second season by both channels in April 2006.

International syndication rights to the series were initially awarded to S.K.A. Distribution in July 2004, a newly formed co-venture between Sardine Productions, Kutoka Interactive and Avanti Ciné Vidéo. Distribution, alongside licensing, merchandise and home video rights were given to PorchLight Entertainment in April 2006. In 2012, Cyber Group Studios acquired the rights in the TV series, which they now distribute.

Episodes

Season 1

Season 2

International broadcast
In Australia, the series is currently airing on Toon-A-Vision. It debuted on ABC on April 17, 2007. The show made its British premiere on CITV on September 1, 2008. From February 16, 2009 onwards, it was moved back to an afternoon time slot on weekdays, broadcasting then new episodes. In the United States, the show aired as part of the Kidmango block on MyFamily TV in 2009.

My Goldfish is Evil has also aired on Arutz HaYeladim in Israel, M-Net in Africa, JCCTV in the Middle East, TV5 Worldwide, MTV3 in Finland, POP TV in Slovenia, MTVA in Hungary and Alshana in Africa.

Home video
The complete series was released on DVD in English and French by Imavision in Canada. And as of 2018, the series became available to be streamed on Tubi TV.

References

External links
CBC My Goldfish is Evil website (Broken)
Sardine Productions

CBC Television original programming
2000s Canadian animated television series
2006 Canadian television series debuts
2008 Canadian television series endings
Canadian children's animated fantasy television series
English-language television shows
Animated television series about children
Animated television series about fish
Television shows set in Montreal
Television shows filmed in Montreal